De Bont is a Dutch surname meaning "the colorful", thought to refer in particular to clothing. Variant forms are De Bondt and De Bonte. The name has been Latinized to Bontius. People with the surname include:

(De) Bont
 (born 1949), Dutch playwright and stage director
Andy De Bont (born 1974), English football goalkeeper
Debbie Bont (born 1990), Dutch handball player
Jan de Bont (born 1943),  Dutch cinematographer, director and film producer
Kevin De Bont (born 1987), Belgian sprint canoer
Rita De Bont (born 1954), Belgian Vlaams Belang politician
De Bondt
Cornelis de Bondt (born 1953), Dutch composer
Dries De Bondt (born 1991), Belgian racing cyclist
Nick de Bondt (born 1994), Dutch football left winger
Werner De Bondt (born 1954), Belgian behavioral economist
De Bondt/ De Bont alias Bontius
 (c. 1537–1599), Dutch physician, botanist, mathematician and astronomer
 (1576–1623), Dutch physician, son of Gerard
Jacob de Bondt (1592–1631), Dutch physician and a pioneer of tropical medicine, son of Gerard 
(De) Bonte 
Bob Bonte (1929–1988), Dutch breaststroke swimmer
Friedrich Bonte (1896–1940), German naval officer 
Hans Bonte (born 1962), Belgian politician
Marc de Bonte (1990–2016), Belgian kickboxer

References

Dutch-language surnames